Larry Pearson (born November 2, 1953) is an American former stock car racing driver and the son of three-time Winston Cup champion David Pearson. He won the Busch Series championship in 1986 and 1987, but struggled during his brief tenure in Winston Cup. His last ride in NASCAR came in the Busch Series in 1999, in the No. 00 Pontiac owned by Buckshot Racing. His Winston Cup statistics include 57 starts and 3 top-tens. His Busch statistics include 259 starts, 15 wins, 78 top-fives, 129 top-tens, 12 poles, and 6 top-ten point finishes (including the two championships).

Pearson was involved in a violent turn two crash with Charlie Glotzbach on March 20, 2010, during a legends race at Bristol Motor Speedway, knocking him unconscious. Pearson regained consciousness before he was lifted out of the car on a backboard and transported by ambulance to a waiting helicopter that flew him to Bristol Regional Medical Center. Pearson suffered a fractured pelvis, fractured right hand, and compound fracture to his left ankle, and underwent surgery the night of March 20 to repair the ankle injury. Two days after the accident, he was released from the Bristol hospital and transported to Charlotte, North Carolina He was admitted into Carolinas Medical Center in fair condition.

Motorsports career results

NASCAR
(key) (Bold – Pole position awarded by qualifying time. Italics – Pole position earned by points standings or practice time. * – Most laps led)

Winston Cup Series

Daytona 500

Busch Series

ARCA Talladega SuperCar Series
(key) (Bold – Pole position awarded by qualifying time. Italics – Pole position earned by points standings or practice time. * – Most laps led.)

References

External links 

Living people
1953 births
Sportspeople from Spartanburg, South Carolina
Racing drivers from South Carolina
NASCAR drivers
NASCAR Xfinity Series champions
ISCARS Dash Touring Series drivers